Kitchen Copse is a   nature reserve north of Bletchingley in Surrey. It is managed by the Surrey Wildlife Trust.

This ancient semi-natural wood has diverse species of trees and ground flora. Flowering plants include dog's mercury, lesser celandine, yellow archangel, bluebell, enchanter's nightshade, primrose and common dog-violet.

There is no public access to the site.

References

Surrey Wildlife Trust